Arthur V. Loughren (September 15, 1902 – December 14, 1993) was an American electrical engineer who played a prominent role in the development of NTSC television.

Loughren was born in Rensselaer, New York, and received his BA (1923) and EE (1925) degrees from Columbia University. He then worked at General Electric in its vacuum tube engineering department 1925–1927; radio engineering department 1927–1929; RCA engineering department 1930–1934; and radio receiver engineering section 1934–1936. In 1936 he joined Hazeltine Corporation, during World War II helped develop IFF equipment for the Navy, and afterwards directed its research on color television. He died at his home in Kailua-Kona, Hawaii.

Loughren was a fellow of the Institute of Radio Engineers, the American Institute of Electrical Engineers, and the Society of Motion Picture and Television Engineers. He received the 1953 SMPTE David Sarnoff Medal Award "for his contributions to the development of compatible color television, including his active work on the principle of constant luminance; for his participation in color video standards activities; and for his guidance in compatible color television", and the 1955 IEEE Morris N. Liebmann Memorial Award "for his leadership and technical contributions in the formulation of the signal specification for compatible color television". Loughren was president of the Institute of Radio Engineers in 1956.

References

External links
 IEEE Obituary
 "Arthur V. Loughren, Director, 1953", Proceedings of the IRE, volume 41, issue 12, December 1953, pages 1698-1698.
 Proceedings of the Institute of Radio Engineers, Volume 26, Number 5, May 1938
 Albert Abramson, The History of Television, 1942 to 2000, McFarland & Company, 2003, page 44. ISBN

1902 births
1993 deaths
American electrical engineers
Columbia College (New York) alumni
Columbia School of Engineering and Applied Science alumni
People from Rensselaer, New York
Engineers from New York (state)
20th-century American engineers